Pavlov (masculine) or Pavlova (feminine or masculine genitive) is the name of several rural localities in Russia.

Modern localities
Pavlov, Bryansk Oblast, a settlement in Krasnovichsky Rural Administrative Okrug of Unechsky District in Bryansk Oblast; 
Pavlov, Belokalitvinsky District, Rostov Oblast, a khutor in Nizhnepopovskoye Rural Settlement of Belokalitvinsky District in Rostov Oblast
Pavlov, Morozovsky District, Rostov Oblast, a khutor in Shiroko-Atamanovskoye Rural Settlement of Morozovsky District in Rostov Oblast
Pavlov, Semikarakorsky District, Rostov Oblast, a khutor in Zolotarevskoye Rural Settlement of Semikarakorsky District in Rostov Oblast
Pavlova, Moscow Oblast, a settlement in Ramenskoye Rural Settlement of Yegoryevsky District in Moscow Oblast
Pavlova, Oryol Oblast, a village in Gnezdilovsky Selsoviet of Bolkhovsky District in Oryol Oblast

Alternative names
Pavlova, alternative name of Pavlovo, a village in Smetaninsky Rural Okrug of Sanchursky District in Kirov Oblast; 
Pavlova, alternative name of Pavlovo, a village in Parfenyevskoye Settlement of Parfenyevsky District in Kostroma Oblast; 
Pavlova, alternative name of Pavlovo, a village in Nezhnovskoye Settlement Municipal Formation of Kingiseppsky District in Leningrad Oblast; 
Pavlova, alternative name of Pavlovo, a selo in Koltushskoye Settlement Municipal Formation of Vsevolozhsky District in Leningrad Oblast;